Bajar Bazar (also Romanized as Bajār Bāzār; also known as Korkoch ‘Os̄mān Bāzār and ‘Os̄mān Bāzār) is a village in Bajar Bazar Rural District, Pir Sohrab District, Chabahar County, Sistan and Baluchestan province, Iran. At the 2006 census, its population was 681, in 133 families.

References 

Populated places in Chabahar County